Calviño is a Spanish surname. Notable people with the surname include:

 Lucas Calviño (born 1984), Argentine footballer
 Nadia Calviño (born 1968), Spanish economist and civil servant

See also
 Calvino (surname)

Spanish-language surnames